is a Japanese football player. He currently plays for Fukushima United FC.

Career statistics
Updated to 23 February 2019.

References

External links

Profile at Fukushima United FC

1985 births
Living people
Kanagawa University alumni
Association football people from Kanagawa Prefecture
Japanese footballers
J2 League players
J3 League players
Japan Football League players
Tochigi SC players
Fukushima United FC players
Association football midfielders